James Patrick Sutton (October 31, 1915 – February 3, 2005) was an American politician and a member of the United States Congress from Tennessee.

Biography
Sutton was born on October 31, 1915, near Wartrace, Bedford County, Tennessee. He attended the public schools of Wartrace, Tennessee, and Cumberland University in Lebanon, Tennessee. He graduated from Middle Tennessee State College in Murfreesboro, Tennessee in 1939.

Career
During World War II, Sutton served in the United States Navy from 1942 to 1946. He was awarded the Distinguished Service Cross, the Silver Star with oak leaf cluster, and the Purple Heart with two oak leaf clusters. On 3 February 1945, during a World War II battle to re-take the Philippines from the Japanese, elements of the U.S. Army's 1st Cavalry Division pushed into the northern outskirts of Manila, with only the steep-sided Tuliahan River separating them from the city proper. A squadron of the 8th Cavalry Regiment reached the bridge just moments after Japanese soldiers had finished preparing it for demolition. As the two sides opened fire on one another, the Japanese lit the fuse leading to the carefully placed explosives. Without hesitation, Lt. Sutton, a Navy demolitions expert attached to the division, dashed through the enemy fire and cut the burning fuse. This heroic act allowed the soldiers of the 
1st Cavalry Division to cross the bridge and seize Manila.

Sutton was elected as a Democrat to the Eighty-first and to the two succeeding Congresses. He served from January 3, 1949 until January 3, 1955.  In 1954, he was an unsuccessful candidate for United States Senator.

Subsequently, Sutton served as the county sheriff for Lawrence County, Tennessee.

In 1963, he and his brother were indicted by a federal grand jury for counterfeiting.  He pleaded guilty in 1964 and was sentenced to one year in prison, and two years probation. He served an additional 10 months in federal prison in 1965 after violating his probation. He later worked as an investment broker, and spent time restoring antiques.

Death
Sutton died in the Lakeland Specialty Hospital, Berrien Center, Berrien County, Michigan, on February 3, 2005 (age 89 years, 95 days). He was cremated, and his ashes are interred at Arlington National Cemetery, Arlington, Virginia.

References

External links

 Retrieved on 2008-02-18

1915 births
2005 deaths
American counterfeiters
United States Navy personnel of World War II
Burials at Arlington National Cemetery
Tennessee sheriffs
Recipients of the Silver Star
Recipients of the Distinguished Service Cross (United States)
Democratic Party members of the United States House of Representatives from Tennessee
20th-century American politicians
People from Bedford County, Tennessee